The Texas League Most Valuable Player Award (MVP) is an annual award given to the best player in Minor League Baseball's Texas League based on their regular-season performance as voted on by league managers. League broadcasters, Minor League Baseball executives, and members of the media have previously voted as well. Though the league was established in 1888, the Player of the Year Award, as it was originally known, was not created until 1931. The Texas League suspended operations during World War II from 1943 to 1945. After the cancellation of the 2020 season, the league was known as the Double-A Central in 2021 before reverting to the Texas League name in 2022. The award became known as the Most Valuable Player Award in 2021.

Thirty-three outfielders have won the MVP Award, the most of any position. First basemen, with 21 winners, have won the most among infielders, followed by third basemen (14), second basemen (8), and shortstops (6). Five pitchers and three catchers have also won the award.

Fourteen players from the El Paso Diablos have been selected for the MVP Award, more than any other team in the league, followed by the San Antonio Missions (8); the Midland RockHounds (7); the Arkansas Travelers and Beaumont Roughnecks (5); the Jackson Generals, Oklahoma City Indians, Springfield Cardinals, and Tulsa Oilers (4); the Amarillo Sonics, Dallas Eagles, Dallas–Fort Worth Spurs, Northwest Arkansas Naturals, and Tulsa Drillers (3); the Albuquerque Dodgers, Beaumont Golden Gators, Fort Worth Cats, Houston Buffaloes, Round Rock Express, and Wichita Wranglers (2); and the Alexandria Aces, Corpus Christi Giants, Corpus Christi Hooks, Galveston Buccaneers, Lafayette Drillers, Rio Grande Valley Giants, Shreveport Sports, and Victoria Rosebuds (1).

Ten players from the St. Louis Cardinals Major League Baseball (MLB) organization have won the award, more than any other, followed by the Los Angeles Angels organization (8); the Houston Astros and Los Angeles Dodgers organizations (7); the Baltimore Orioles and Milwaukee Brewers organizations (6); the Kansas City Royals, Oakland Athletics, and San Francisco Giants organizations (5); the Detroit Tigers and San Diego Padres organizations (4); the Chicago Cubs and New York Mets organizations (3); the Cleveland Guardians, New York Yankees, and Seattle Mariners organizations (2); and the Arizona Diamondbacks, Chicago White Sox, Colorado Rockies, Philadelphia Phillies, and Texas Rangers organizations (1). Five award winners played for teams that were not affiliated with any MLB organization.

Winners

Wins by team

Active Texas League teams appear in bold.

Wins by organization

Active Texas League–Major League Baseball affiliations appear in bold.

Notes

References
Specific

General

Awards established in 1931
MVP
Minor league baseball trophies and awards
Minor league baseball MVP award winners